Boraqchin Khatun was an Alchi Tatar woman. Now Alchi Tatar are known as Alchin. This is a tribe of Turkic peoples (Kazakhs). Chinese called them Alchi Tatars, but they called themselves Alchin for women and Alchitai for men.

She was the chief or senior wife of Batu Khan, and probably the mother of Sartaq Khan. In 1257, she served as regent of the Golden Horde on behalf of Ulaghchi, who was Sartaq's son and probably her grandson. After Ulaghchi's death, Berke ousted Boraqchin and took control of the Golden Horde.

References

Women of the Mongol Empire
13th-century women rulers